The 2013–14 Western Illinois Leathernecks men's basketball team represented Western Illinois University during the 2013–14 NCAA Division I men's basketball season. The Leathernecks, led by sixth year head coach Jim Molinari, played their home games at Western Hall and were members of The Summit League. They finished the season 10–20, 4–10 in The Summit League play to finish in seventh place. They lost in the quarterfinals of The Summit League tournament to South Dakota State.

At the end of the season, head coach Jim Molinari resigned to take an assistants job at Nebraska. His record was 79–104 in six seasons.

Roster

Schedule

|-
! colspan="9" style="background:#639; color:gold;"| Exhibition

|-
! colspan="9" style="background:#639; color:gold;"| Regular season

|-
! colspan="9" style="background:#639; color:gold;"| The Summit League tournament

References

Western Illinois Leathernecks men's basketball seasons
Western Illinois
Western
Western